Hippurarctia judith is a moth of the family Erebidae. It was described by Sergius G. Kiriakoff in 1959. It is found in the Democratic Republic of the Congo and Ghana.

References

 

Syntomini
Moths described in 1959